Bnin may refer to the following places in Poland:
Bnin, Kórnik, a former town, now part of Kórnik near Poznań
Bnin, Nakło County 
Bnin, Włocławek County